UFC Fight Night: Muniz vs. Allen (also known as UFC Fight Night 220, UFC on ESPN+ 78 and UFC Vegas 70) was a mixed martial arts event produced by the Ultimate Fighting Championship that took place on February 25, 2023, at the UFC Apex facility in Enterprise, Nevada, part of the Las Vegas Metropolitan Area, United States.

Background
A light heavyweight bout between Nikita Krylov and former LFA Light Heavyweight Champion Ryan Spann was expected to headline the event. However, the headliner was cancelled during the broadcast as Krylov fell ill. As a result, the middleweight bout between André Muniz and former LFA Middleweight Champion Brendan Allen was elevated to the new main event. Krylov and Spann were eventually rescheduled to meet at UFC Fight Night: Yan vs. Dvalishvili two weeks later.

A lightweight bout between Jordan Leavitt and Victor Martinez took place the event. They were previously scheduled to meet at UFC on ESPN: Luque vs. Muhammad 2 but Martinez withdrew from the event due to undisclosed reasons.

A women's flyweight bout between Cortney Casey and Jasmine Jasudavicius was expected to take place at the event. However, Casey withdrew from the event due to an undisclosed medical reason and was replaced by former interim LFA Women's Flyweight Champion Gabriella Fernandes.

A featherweight bout between Andre Fili and Lucas Almeida was expected to take place at the event. However, Fili was forced to withdraw from the bout due to emergency eye surgery and the bout was canceled.

A flyweight bout between Ode' Osbourne and Denys Bondar was scheduled for the event. However, Bondar withdrew from the event for undisclosed reasons and he was replaced by Charles Johnson at a catchweight of 130 pounds. 

Erick Gonzalez was scheduled to face Darrius Flowers and Trevor Peek was expected to meet Alex Reyes in lightweight bouts respectively for the event. However, for unknown reasons, both Flower and Reyes were pulled from the event and Peek was scheduled to face Gonzalez instead.

Garrett Armfield and José Johnson were expected to meet in a bantamweight bout at the preliminary card. However, the pairing was scrapped after Johnson was pulled due to a medical issue.

A women's bantamweight bout between Hailey Cowan and Ailin Perez was expected to take place at the event. However, the day before the event, Cowan withdrew due to illness and the bout was canceled.

Results

Bonus awards 
The following fighters received $50,000 bonuses.

Fight of the Night: No bonus awarded.
Performance of the Night: Brendan Allen, Tatiana Suarez, Mike Malott, Trevor Peek, Jordan Leavitt, and Joe Solecki

See also 

 List of UFC events
 List of current UFC fighters
 2023 in UFC

References 

 

UFC Fight Night
2023 in mixed martial arts
February 2023 sports events in the United States
2023 in sports in Nevada
Mixed martial arts in Las Vegas
Sports competitions in Las Vegas